Manuel Mur Oti (25 October 1908 – 5 August 2003) was a Spanish screenwriter and film director. He also acted in one film, the neorealist Segundo López (1953).

Selected filmography
 Four Women (1947)
 Guest of Darkness (1948)
 Ninety Minutes (1949)
 Wings of Youth (1949)
 A Man on the Road (1949)
 Black Sky (1951)
 Segundo López (1953)
 Condemned (1953)
 Pride (1955)
 Fedra (1956)
 The Battalion in the Shadows (1957)
 A Girl from Chicago (1960)
 Kill and Be Killed (1962)
 Loca juventud (1965)

References

Bibliography 
 Bentley, Bernard. A Companion to Spanish Cinema. Boydell & Brewer 2008.

External links 
 

1908 births
2003 deaths
Spanish film directors
People from Vigo
20th-century Spanish screenwriters
20th-century Spanish male writers